Comercy Abbey or Saint-Paul de Cormery Abbey is a former Benedictine abbey located on the territory of the commune of Cormery in the French department of Indre-et-Loire in the Centre-Val de Loire region.

History

A simple monastic foundation of Ithier of St. Martin in 791, it was raised in the year 800 to the rank of abbey by Alcuin, and adopted the rule of Saint Benedict. It was then attached to the abbey of Saint-Martin in Tours, and remained so until the dissolution of the monastic community during the Revolution. Despite the damage caused by the Vikings in the second half of the ninth century, which is difficult to quantify, the abbey developed rapidly, and around it the town of Cormery. In the middle of the Middle Ages, the abbey had many possessions in several French provinces and its boats could navigate freely on all the waterways of the kingdom; with fifty monks, it was one of the most powerful abbeys in Tours. During his tour of France in 1096, Pope Urban II affirmed the authority of the abbey of St Martin of Tour over the abbey of Comery and that each newly elected abbot had to be invested with his pastoral staff at the tomb of St Martin. On July 19th 1103 Guillermus Ludovicus, bishop of Salpi and former monk of the monastery, presented abbot Guy (abbot between 1070 and 1111) with several relics such as the heads of St James the Persian and St Adrian and hairs of St Paul that Guillermus had collected while serving as chaplain in Nicomedia in the Byzantine Empire. 

The abbey was able to recover from damages it incurred in the Hundred Years' War but it never fully recovered from destructions by the Protestants it suffered in Wars of Religion when many of its relics were desecrated and scattered. In spite of the intervention of the Maurists from 1662 onwards, it did not regain its lustre, its numbers diminished inexorably and it was an already weakened abbey that finally succumbed to the suppression of the congregations during the French Revolution, in 1790. The last monks were dispersed, the buildings sold as national property were destroyed or divided up and then redesigned.

In the 21st century, however, there are still important vestiges of the Saint-Paul de Cormery abbey, scattered in an urban landscape where their original unity is sometimes difficult to identify among the recent constructions: the Saint-Paul tower (the bell tower-porch of the abbey church), a Gothic chapel in the choir, the refectory, which has been largely preserved even though it has undergone a lot of remodeling, and a portion of the gallery of the cloister are still standing. On the periphery of the monastic enclosure, the dwellings of the abbot, the prior and the sacristan remain. In stages between 1908 and 1933, all of these remains, with the exception of the sacristan's dwelling, were classified or registered as historical monuments, while the capitals of the preserved parts are listed in the general inventory of cultural heritage.

References

Bibliographic sources 

 Agence Bailly-Leblanc et Thalweg Paysage, « Commune de Cormery - élaboration d'une aire de mise en valeur de l'architecture et du patrimoine - diagnostic AVAP » [PDF], on the website of the State services in Indre-et-Loire.
 Octave Bobeau, « Les églises de Cormery (Indre-et-Loire) », Bulletin archéologique du Comité des travaux historiques et scientifiques,‎ 1908, p. 344-370.
 Jean-Jacques Bourassé, « Cartulaire de Cormery, précédé de l'histoire de l'abbaye et de la ville de Cormery, d'après les chartes », Mémoire de la Société archéologique de Touraine, Tours, t. XII, 1861, p. 1-325
 Philippe Chapu, « L'abbaye de Cormery, visite guidée », Bulletin de la société des amis du pays lochois,‎ December 1991, p. 119-138 (ISSN 1244-3816, OCLC 473577837).
 Annick Chupin, « Cormery 1791-1820. Le dépeçage d'une abbaye millénaire », Bulletin de la Société archéologique de Touraine, t. XLIV,‎ 1995, p. 537-550 (ISSN 1153-2521).
 Annick Chupin, « Historiens de l'abbaye de Cormery au xviie siècle : Dom Yves Gaigneron et Dom Gilbert Gérard », Bulletin de la Société archéologique de Touraine, t. XLVI,‎ 2000, p. 253-268 (ISSN 1153-2521).
 Annick Chupin, « Alcuin et Cormery », Annales de Bretagne et des pays de l'Ouest, Presses universitaires de Rennes, t. CXII, no 3,‎ 2004, p. 103-112.
 Charles Lelong, « Vestiges romans de l'abbatiale de Cormery », Bulletin Monumental, t. CXXIV, no 4,‎ 1966, p. 381-387.
 Charles Lelong, « Encore Cormery… », Bulletin de la Société archéologique de Touraine, t. XLIV,‎ 1996, p. 785-791 (ISSN 1153-2521).
 Frédéric Lesueur, « Cormery », in Congrès archéologique de France, CVIth session held in Tours in 1948, Paris, Société française d'archéologie, 1949, 416 p., p. 82-110. 
 Valérie Mauret-Cribellier, « L'abbaye bénédictine Saint-Paul de Cormery (Indre-et-Loire) », Bulletin de la Société archéologique de Touraine, t. XLIV,‎ 1994, p. 119-144 (ISSN 1153-2521).
 Michel-J. Peutin, Cormery : mille ans d'histoire d'une abbaye, Truyes, Cadic, 1986, 18 p.
 Thomas Pouyet, Cormery et son territoire : origines et transformations d’un établissement monastique dans la longue durée (8e-18e siècles) : Archéologie et Préhistoire, vol. I : Texte, Tours, Université de Tours / Région Centre-Val de Loire, 2019, 399 p. 
 Thomas Pouyet, Cormery et son territoire : origines et transformations d’un établissement monastique dans la longue durée (8e-18e siècles) : Archéologie et Préhistoire, vol. II : Corpus de preuves, Tours, Université de Tours / Région Centre-Val de Loire, 2019, 309 p.
 Thomas Pouyet, « Cormery et son territoire : origines et transformations d’un établissement monastique dans la longue durée (viiie – xviiie siècle) », Bulletin du centre d’études médiévales d’Auxerre, no 24.2,‎ 2020.

Monasteries
Benedictine monasteries
Benedictine monasteries in France
Buildings and structures in Indre-et-Loire
Buildings and structures in Centre-Val de Loire
Christian monasteries established in the 8th century
Monuments historiques of Centre-Val de Loire